Royston is a rural locality in the Somerset Region, Queensland, Australia.

Geography 
The D'Aguilar Highway passes through the south of Royston where the Stanley River marks the southern boundary.  In the north lies the southern foothills of the Conondale Range.

History 
The locality takes its name from a former railway station, which in turn was named after the freehold property of grazier William Butler.

Education 
There are no schools in Royston. The nearest government primary schools are Kilcoy State School in Kilcoy to the west and Mount Kilcoy State School in Mount Kilcoy to north-west. The nearest government secondary school is Kilcoy State High School in Kilcoy.

See also
 List of tramways in Queensland

References

Suburbs of Somerset Region
Localities in Queensland